American art may refer to:
 Visual art of the United States, the history of painting and visual art in the US
 Visual arts by indigenous peoples of the Americas
 American Art (album), a 2007 indie rock album
 American Art (journal), a peer-reviewed academic journal